Mission: Impossible is an adventure video game developed by Rebellion Developments and released for the Game Boy Color in 1999.

Gameplay
Mission: Impossible is an adventure game where the player must control Ethan Hunt through ten levels. The game also contains a number of utility programs which include a calculator, an address book, and a notebook which can print entries when connected to a Game Boy Printer. The utilities also include a message transmitter and a universal remote which both use the system's infrared port.

Reception

Mission: Impossible received mixed reviews according to video game review aggregator GameRankings. Reviewers compared it negatively to Metal Gear: Ghost Babel, but praised the game's extra features. N64 Magazine described it as a "painfully average" game, stating that opponents wander around in set patterns and that they are not smart enough to notice the player.

References

External links

1999 video games
Game Boy Color games
Game Boy Color-only games
Infogrames games
Mission: Impossible video games
Video games based on adaptations
Rebellion Developments games
Spy video games
Video games developed in the United Kingdom